Oliveburg is an unincorporated community in Jefferson County, in the U.S. state of Pennsylvania.

History
A post office was established at Oliveburg in 1862.

References

Unincorporated communities in Jefferson County, Pennsylvania
1862 establishments in Pennsylvania
Unincorporated communities in Pennsylvania